Radio Ukraine International (Ukrainian: Всесвітня служба "Радіо Україна"), abbreviated RUI, is the official international broadcasting station of Ukraine.

As a section of Suspilne and working from studios located in the heart of the capital city Kyiv, Radio Ukraine International is developing programming and news broadcasts in five languages (English, German, Romanian, Russian and Ukrainian).

The mission of RUI is to acquaint foreign listeners with all diversity of political and social-economic life, current affairs, cultural history, spiritual life, and music of Ukraine. The broadcasts of RUI are also intended to help Ukrainians living abroad to remain informed and in touch with home. The Romanian language broadcasts are produced and transmitted from studio facilities located in Chernivtsi.

Program broadcast formats
Radio Ukraine International provides cost free digital programming with reception available in 67 countries including the entire European continent via the "Astra 4A" satellite, in mono on the left or right channels within channel "RUI 2".
Parameters of satellite "Astra 4A": 4.8° East, transponder 4.03B, frequency 11766 MHz, horizontal polarization, SR 27.500 Ms/s, FEC 3/4.
Internet MP3 stream (see External Links)
Internet radios - channel NRCU 4

Daily English language program schedule
Monday      - News, Ukrainian Perspective, Insight, Reading Lounge.
Tuesday     - News, Ukrainian Perspective, Panorama, Famous Ukrainians.
Wednesday   - News, Ukrainian Perspective, Highlights, Reading Lounge.
Thursday    - News, Ukrainian Perspective, Close Up, Start Ups.
Friday      - News, World.ua, Roots.
Saturday    - News, Ukrainian Diary, Hello from Kyiv, Sports and Fun.
Sunday      - News, Ukrainian Diary, Music from Ukraine.

English language program details
 "Close Up" - 	              Analytical program of International political and economical aspirations and perspectives of Ukraine.
 "Famous Ukrainians" -         Essays about outstanding people of Ukraine, poets, musicians, scientists, scholars, and historical figures.
 "Hello from Kyiv" - 	      Listeners letters question and answer program, musical requests, entertaining commentaries.
 "Highlights" - 	              Program about Ukrainians, their aspirations and life style.
 "Insight" - 	              Program about Ukraine, its people, spiritual, and day-to-day life.
 "Music from Ukraine" -        Musical concert of different genres each week.
 "News" -                      A current news report begins each broadcast.
 "Panorama" - 	              Program about the most important trends in Ukrainian cinematography, literature, music and social projects.
 "Reading Lounge" - 	      Readings of literary works by famous Ukrainian writers and poets.
 "Roots" - 	              Cultural, educational, and history programs including the feature "Ukraine Land of the Cossacks"
 "Sports and Fun" -            Program about sports shaping our bodies and lives, and people who dare to push the limits.
 "Start Ups" - 	              Program about cutting-edge ideas and grass root initiatives in Ukraine.
 "Ukrainian Diary" - 	      Digest of the most important news and events of the past week.
 "Ukrainian Perspective" -     Daily in depth digest of the day's news, and commentary of current affairs.
 "World.ua" - 	              Review of Ukrainian and International press releases.

Programme schedule 
As of April 2021, one hour long RUI broadcasts can be heard daily starting at:
1900 UTC - German
2000 UTC - English

Older information (unconfirmed) - English at:
2300 UTC - 7PM EDT
0200 UTC - 10PM EDT
0500 UTC - 1AM EDT
0700 UTC - 3AM EDT
0900 UTC - 5AM EDT
1200 UTC - 8AM EDT

History of RUI on shortwave radio
Radio Ukraine International began operation in March 1992 as the first International broadcast station of independent Ukraine. Formally known as Radio Kiev, a "sister" station to Radio Moscow during the Soviet era. Interval signal is music of the "Bandura".

Operated multiple high power transmitters using directional phased antenna arrays. Offers distinctive QSL cards to shortwave listeners for swl dx signal reception reports. Provided clear channel reception on frequencies in the 41 meter, 31 meter, 25 meter, and 19 meter shortwave bands.

Shortwave broadcasts were terminated in December 2010 from the lack of state support and funding. Since then the radio station is now taking the first steps in multimedia development with a new website on the World Wide Web with information in text, sound and images from and about Ukraine and Ukrainians.

Radio Kiev and Ukrainian Radio
In the 1920s and 1930s, due to the lack of accurate or reliable information, Radio Kiev or the Kiev Radio was a common name used outside of Ukraine for shortwave broadcast stations located within the Ukrainian Soviet Socialist Republic. The Wireless World guide of 1935 reported station RW20 operating from Kharkov in eastern Ukraine on a longwave frequency of 385 kHz with power of 10 kW broadcasting in Russian. With the onset of World War II in 1941 and the subsequent Nazi occupation of the Ukrainian S.S.R. radio broadcast stations were captured and removed from service. At the end of World War II, during 1946, radio broadcasting began to revive and the World Radio guide of 1946 reported the following stations on the air in Ukraine:

Kiev 1 on 248 kHz with 120 kW power
Kiev 2 on 832 kHz with 35 kW power
Kharkov on 385 kHz with 10 kW power
Odessa on 968 kHz with 10 kW power
Dnepropetrovsk on 913 kHz with 10 kW power

On November 1, 1950, Radio Kiev was formally introduced and transmitted its first broadcasts in the Ukrainian language only. These broadcasts were intended to reach the Ukrainian diaspora via shortwave radio, with frequencies in the 31, 25, and 19 meter shortwave bands using high power amplitude modulated (AM) transmitters with omni-directional antennas. In October 1962 Radio Kiev introduced its first English language program broadcast schedule with daily transmissions on various shortwave frequencies. These transmissions originated from multiple transmitting sites employing high power Russian made (KOM) transmitters and gain type "steerable" antenna systems capable of the precision directing of radio broadcasts to desired regions worldwide. In 1966 German language programming was introduced, followed by Romanian language broadcasts in 1970, along with additional transmitting sites. By the late 1970s the following transmitting sites were active full-time on various time and frequency schedules within the territory:

Kiev region (Brovary) - 1 site of 15 kW, 4 sites of 100 kW, and 5 sites of 200 kW
Donetsk region (Kopani) - 2 sites of 100 kW, 2 sites of 250 kW, and 4 sites of 1000 kW
Lviv region (Krasne) - 3 sites of 200 kW, 2 sites of 1000 kW
Kharkiv region (Kharkiv) - 3 sites of 100 kW
Odessa region (Odessa) - 2 sites of 100 kW

See also 
 Radio Ukraine, the publicly funded radio broadcaster in Ukraine.

References

External links
 Radio Ukraine International Website
 RUI live stream (192 kbit/sec MP3) and alternative (128 kbit/sec MP3)

Radio stations in Ukraine
International broadcasters
Radio stations established in 1925